Qarachar may refer to:

 Qarah Charyan, a village in Zanjan Province, Iran
 Qarah Char, a village in Kurdistan Province, Iran
 Qarachar Noyan, an ancestor of Timur